The Al Basra-class offshore support vessel (manufacturer designates as RiverHawk OSV 60) is a  multi-function offshore support vessel, providing a wide range of capabilities from command and control, to support and protection of oil/Gas installations, to acting as a "mothership" for patrol boats. Vessels of the class are operated by the United States Navy and the Iraqi Navy.

Designer and naval architects 
International Maritime Consultants (IMC) was responsible for the functional design of the Iraqi Navy Al Basra class 60 metre OSV. The original design draws heavily from the offshore support vessel sector, since the boats were designed to conduct both maritime security operations and offshore service tasks.

IMC is an independent naval architecture consultancy based in Fremantle, Western Australia, providing a comprehensive range of naval architecture, marine engineering and project management services to the global marine, maritime and offshore industries.

Features and capabilities

Troops transport
Al Basra class ships can accommodate dozens of troops including Marine Commandos, SCUBA divers or transport support for crew changes and resupply to the platforms. The well deck accommodate two Fast attack boats and gives the vessel the capability to intercept suspicious vessels, search and rescue and landing troops on shore.

Support
The Al Basra class is constructed and fitted to accomplish a variety of jobs. The vessel is equipped with a firefighting capability and fire monitors for fighting external fires at sea.  Also, the vessel is equipped with oil containment and recovery equipment to assist in the cleanup of a spill at sea. In addition the vessel has a towage capacity of 3150 BHP.

Patrol vessel
The Al Basra class is a blue water vessel operational and maneuverable in very difficult weather conditions, the vessel can accomplish all the mission of an offshore patrol vessel. The vessel has the capacity to acting as a "mothership" for small patrol boats and has the mission to provide logistic support from repairs, to crew provisions, to refueling.

Armament
Ships of the Al Basra are supplied with one 30 mm MSI Seahawk   for air defense and naval gunfire. They are also equipped with four 12.7 mm M2-HB Browing machine guns and six M240 light machine guns.

References

External links
 Navy Accepts Support Vessel for Iraq, July 19, 2012.
 USA: Northrop Grumman Advanced Shipboard Electronic Systems to Enter Service on New OSV, October 2012.

Patrol vessels of the United States Navy